Aurélien Comte (born 11 September 1988) is a French racing driver currently competing in the TCR International Series and the TCR BeNeLux Touring Car Championship. Having previously competed in the European Touring Car Cup, SEAT León Supercopa France and Renault Clio Cup France amongst others.

Racing career
Comte began his career in 2005 in Karting, he continued in karting until 2006. In 2006 he switched to the Renault Clio Cup France series, he continued in the series up until 2008 where he finished fourth in the championship standings having finished eighth in 2007. For 2010 he switched to the SEAT León Supercopa France series, finishing sixth in the championship standings in his first year in the series. He continued in the series for 2011, taking a single victory and several podiums on his way to finishing fifth in the standings. 2012 was his last year in the series and he finished it with taking several victories, podiums and pole positions as well as finishing third in the standings. For 2013 he took part in the European Touring Car Cups Single-Makes Trophy class, finishing third in the class standings after several victories in class. In 2014 he switched to the Peugeot RCZ Racing Cup France series, winning the championship after taking eight victories out of thirteen possible. He continued in the series for 2015, again winning the championship. For 2016 he raced in three different championships, like in 2014 and 2015 he raced in the Peugeot RCZ Racing Cup France, however he only took part in one championship round. He also made one-off appearances in the TCR BeNeLux Touring Car Championship and Championnat de France Prototypes series.

For 2017 he returned full-time to the TCR BeNeLux Touring Car Championship partnering Kevin Abbring in the Peugeot 308 Racing Cup, with the pair taking several victories and finishing fourth in the standings. After finishing the 2017 TCR BeNeLux Touring Car Championship season, he went on to compete in the one-off TCR Europe Trophy event again driving for his TCR BeNeLux team DG Sport Compétition and still driving the Peugeot. Comte went on to finish third in Race and finished second in Race 2, which was won by Gabriele Tarquini. However, since Tarquini was ineligible for points the win went to him and therefore he became the 2017 TCR Europe Trophy champion.

In November 2017 it was announced that he would race in the TCR International Series, driving an Opel Astra TCR for his TCR BeNeLux team DG Sport Compétition.

Racing record

Complete TCR International Series results
(key) (Races in bold indicate pole position) (Races in italics indicate fastest lap)

† Driver did not finish the race, but was classified as he completed over 90% of the race distance.

Complete World Touring Car Cup results
(key) (Races in bold indicate pole position) (Races in italics indicate fastest lap)

† Driver did not finish the race, but was classified as he completed over 90% of the race distance.

Complete TCR Europe Touring Car Series results
(key) (Races in bold indicate pole position) (Races in italics indicate fastest lap)

TCR Spa 500 results

References

External links
 
 

1988 births
Living people
TCR International Series drivers
French racing drivers
Racing drivers from Paris
TCR Europe Touring Car Series drivers
World Touring Car Cup drivers